Mondemkhallu is a village panchayat in Kurupam mandal of Vizianagaram district in Andhra Pradesh, India.

There is a post office at Mondemkhallu. The PIN code is 535534.

Geography
It has an average elevation of 191 meters (629 feet).

Demographics
, the demographic details of the village is as follows:
 Total Population: 	2,316 in 495 Households.
 Male Population: 	1,263
 Female Population: 	1,053
 Children Under 6-years of age: 280 (Boys - 147 and Girls and 133)
 Total Literates: 	1,366

References

Villages in Vizianagaram district postel coad 535534